The 2019 Internazionali di Tennis Città di Perugia was a professional tennis tournament played on clay courts. It was the fifth edition of the tournament which was part of the 2019 ATP Challenger Tour. It took place in Perugia, Italy between 8 and 14 July 2019.

Singles main-draw entrants

Seeds

 1 Rankings are as of 1 July 2019.

Other entrants
The following players received wildcards into the singles main draw:
  Lorenzo Musetti
  Julian Ocleppo
  Andrea Pellegrino
  Aldin Šetkić
  Giulio Zeppieri

The following players received entry into the singles main draw using their ITF World Tennis Ranking:
  Riccardo Bonadio
  Raúl Brancaccio
  Oriol Roca Batalla
  Pietro Rondoni
  Roman Safiullin

The following players received entry from the qualifying draw:
  Guilherme Clezar
  Pavel Kotov

Champions

Singles

  Federico Delbonis def.  Guillermo García López 6–0, 1–6, 7–6(7–5).

Doubles

  Tomislav Brkić /  Ante Pavić def.  Rogério Dutra Silva /  Szymon Walków 6–4, 6–3.

References

Internazionali di Tennis Città di Perugia
2019
2019 in Italian tennis
July 2019 sports events in Italy